Events from the year 2012 in Macau, China.

Incumbents
 Chief Executive - Fernando Chui
 President of the Legislative Assembly - Lau Cheok Va

Events

April
 11 April - The opening of Sands Cotai Central in Cotai.

June
 16 June - 2012 Hong Kong–Macau Interport at Macau Stadium.

September
 20 September - The opening of Sheraton Macao Hotel, Cotai Central in Cotai.

October
 18–21 October - Men's Macau Open 2012.

November
 27 November - The start of 2012 Macau Open Grand Prix Gold at Macau Forum.

December
 2 December - The end of 2012 Macau Open Grand Prix Gold at Macau Forum.

References

 
Years of the 21st century in Macau
Macau
Macau
2010s in Macau